Komyshivka is an urban-type settlement in the Pokrovsk Raion, Donetsk Oblast (province) of eastern Ukraine.  The population is

Demographics
Native language as of the Ukrainian Census of 2001:
 Ukrainian 23.57%
 Russian 75.36%
 Belarusian 0.54%

References

Urban-type settlements in Pokrovsk Raion